East Carmarthenshire was a county constituency in Carmarthenshire, Wales.  It returned one Member of Parliament (MP)  to the House of Commons of the Parliament of the United Kingdom, elected by the first past the post voting system.

It was created for the 1885 general election, when the old two-member Carmarthenshire constituency was divided into two new single-member seats: East Carmarthenshire and West Carmarthenshire, both of which were in turn abolished for the 1918 general election.

Boundaries 
The constituency included parts of the Sessional Divisions of Llandeilo and Llandovery and the Sessional Division of Llanelly.

Members of Parliament

History

1885-90
Both sitting members for the  former Carmarthenshire constituency chose to contest the West Carmarthenshire division, which created an opportunity for a new Liberal candidate in the new Eastern division. It was anticipated that it would produce a strong Liberal vote, primarily in the emerging industrial communities which emerged as a result of the development off the anthracite coal and tinplate industries. The increase in the electorate in these communities was striking. For example, the number of voters in that part of the parish of Llanelli that was outside the borough constituency rose from 615 to 1,500, Similarly, the electorate in Pembrey increased from 377 to 1,000, in Hendy from 190 to 620, in Brynamman from 175 to 450, and in Cwmamman from 164 to 550.

A Liberal association was established in June at a meeting in Ammanford which was addressed by David Pugh, Lewis Morris and John Lloyd Morgan. Pugh had previously served as  MP for Carmarthenshire from 1857 until his defeat in 1868, while Morris was a well known literary figure. Morgan was the least known of the three speakers, but as the son of William Morgan, former Principal of the Presbyterian College at Carmarthen, had strong local connections.

Pugh was shortly later selected as candidate. He had been considered to be on the more conservative wing of the Liberal Party but had become increasingly radical in his pronouncements in recent years. The significant increase in the electorate in the industrial portions of the constituency was considered to be the key element in deciding the contest. The electorate of Cwmamman, for example, had increased from 164 to 550 and that of neighbouring Brynamman from 175 to 450. However, the characters of the local Liberal Association was reflected in the choice of Sir Arthur Stepney, who by reason of his influence and wealth was a prominent figure in their ranks, as its first president. Pugh was re-elected in 1886 but in his last years as member there were frequent criticisms at the annual meetings of the Liberal association of Pugh's regular absences from the Commons.

Pugh announced his retirement in June 1890 and died a few weeks later. After a lively series of meetings the Liberal Association chose the Swansea-based lawyer, Abel Thomas as candidate, in preference to the more radical Llanelli businessman, Gwilym Evans. Thomas was returned unopposed after the Conservatives chose not to contest the by-election.

1890-1900
Upon his death in 1890 he was succeeded by Abel Thomas. Within two years, there were criticisms of the new member centred around alleged criticisms of nonconformist ministers and his representing licensed victualers asa barrister. Thomas successfully defended his record and a vote of confidence was passed at the annual meeting of the Liberal Association at Ammanford in June 1892. At the General Election some weeks later, Thomas was unexpectedly opposed by a Liberal Unionist candidate, the Swansea businessman Captain Thomas Davies. It was argued that Davies would gain support from Calvinistic Methodists, who opposed Thomas's links to the liquor trade. However, Thomas won with a large majority.

At the 1895 general election, Thomas was opposed by E.E. Richardson of Glanbrydan Park. Richardson polled better than Davies three years earlier but Thomas still won a comfortable victory. He faced the same opponent at the 1900 general election, once again with a similar result.

1900-1912
Criticisms of Thomas persisted, but he served for twenty two years until his death in 1912. By this time, the first signals of the emergence of the Labour Party were seen in the constituency, but a Labour candidate made little impact at the 1910 general election.

1912 by-election

Following Thomas's death the favourite to succeed him was the prominent nonconformist minister, Josiah Towyn Jones, who had been active in the politics of the constituency since the late 1880s. A somewhat half-hearted attempt was made by some prominent Liberals to select a less radical candidate but these came to nothing.

Mervyn Peel, who had opposed Thomas in 1910, fought a spirited campaign but the Independent Labour Party candidate, Dr J.H. Williams, was denied support by the Labour Party nationally and made a limited impact. Jones was returned with a comfortable majority and remained the member until the constituency was abolished in 1918.

Election results

Elections in the 1880s

Elections in the 1890s
Pugh's death caused a by-election.

Elections in the 1900s

Elections in the 1910s

References 

Historic parliamentary constituencies in South Wales
Constituencies of the Parliament of the United Kingdom established in 1885
Constituencies of the Parliament of the United Kingdom disestablished in 1918
East Carmarthenshire